Hajj and Pilgrimage Organization of Iran was founded in 1979 and before that Hajj was managed by Ministry of Interior. In Iran, this organization is subset of Ministry of Culture and Islamic Guidance. Also, the Hajj and Pilgrimage Organization is government organization and goals determine with Iran's policies, thoughts of Ruhollah Khomeini, guidelines of the Supreme Leader, and president.

Saeed Owhadi was head of Hajj and Pilgrimage Organization and before that worked in another part of this organization. He is a graduate of Sharif University of Technology and California State University, Long Beach. Previous head of the organization was Seyyed Ahmad Mousavi. Ali Reza Rashidian is the current head of the organization who was appointed on 5 December 2018.

In January 2016, after executions of Nimr Baqir al-Nimr, leader Shia in Saudi Arabia's Eastern Province, Iranian protesters stormed Saudi Arabia embassy in Tehran. After this event, Saudi Arabia cut off relations with Iran. Saeed Owhadi said: "the decision to continue or suspend hajj travel to Mecca and Medina would ultimately be up to Supreme Leader Ayatollah Ali Khamenei."

See also 
 Islamic Development Organization
 Ali Qazi Askar
 Abdul Fattah Nawab

References

External links 
 Website of Hajj and Pilgrimage Organization
 Iranians pilgrimage to Iraq's holy cities risen to 40 percent

1979 establishments in Iran
Hajj
Government organizations related to the Hajj